Ulrich Lange (died 1549) was a composer and Thomaskantor from 1540 to 1549.

References

Thomaskantors
16th-century German composers
1549 deaths
Year of birth unknown